Scott Coffey (born Thomas Scott Coffey; May 1, 1964) is an American actor, director, producer and screenwriter. His film credits include Shag, Some Kind of Wonderful, Dream Lover, and Mulholland Drive. He directed the films Ellie Parker (2005) and Adult World (2013).

Coffey was nominated for the Independent Spirit Award for Best Supporting Male for his performance in Shag.

Biography

Personal life
Coffey was born and raised in Honolulu, Hawaii, where he began his acting career appearing in school plays, community theatre and with the Hawaii Performing Arts Company. He also appeared in several episodic television shows. He later became a writer and director. Coffey lives in Berlin, Germany, and Los Angeles with his longtime boyfriend, novelist Blair Mastbaum.

Career
At sixteen, he moved to Rome, attending high school and acting in films including Once Upon a Time in America. Coffey's favorite film was Bertolucci's La Luna which sparked his desire to move to Italy. Later, he moved to New York where he signed with the William Morris Agency and studied acting while co-starring in the off-Broadway play It's All Talk.

After a year he moved to Los Angeles to pursue his film career, appearing in Ferris Bueller's Day Off and SpaceCamp. His television work included a special The New Twilight Zone episode entitled "Private Channel", as well as an episode of Amazing Stories directed by Robert Zemeckis. In 1989, Coffey played the major role of Chip in Shag.

His first feature film, Ellie Parker (2005), which finished production in July 2005, was an Official Selection of the 2005 Sundance Film Festival and won the New American Cinema Special Jury Prize at the Seattle International Film Festival. He wrote All God's Children Can Dance, a film adaptation of a story by Haruki Murakami. Coffey also directed the 2013 indie Adult World.

Coffey formed a friendship with actress Naomi Watts when the two worked together in the 1995 film Tank Girl. Coffey directed Watts in Ellie Parker and past shorts of the same character name. The two have also appeared in other works together, including the 2001 mystery feature Mulholland Drive.

Filmography

Directorial work

Awards and nominations

References

External links
Official Site

Scott Coffey Interview

1964 births
Living people
American male film actors
American film producers
American music video directors
American male screenwriters
American male television actors
Male actors from Hawaii
Male actors from Honolulu
LGBT people from Hawaii
American gay actors
Film directors from Oregon
Film directors from Hawaii
Screenwriters from Hawaii
Writers from Honolulu